GKE may refer to:
 Google Kubernetes Engine, part of Google Cloud Platform
 NATO Air Base Geilenkirchen, in Germany
 Ndai language, native to Cameroon